Hungarian nationality law is based on the principles of jus sanguinis. Hungarian citizenship can be acquired by descent from a Hungarian parent, or by naturalisation. A person born in Hungary to foreign parents does not generally acquire Hungarian citizenship. A Hungarian citizen is also a citizen of the European Union.

The current Hungarian nationality law came into force in 1993. By changes made in January 2011, every person who was a Hungarian citizen or a descendant of a person who was a Hungarian citizen before 1920 (only the Kingdom of Hungary, part of the Austro-Hungarian Empire, is eligible) or between 1941 and 1945 and speaks Hungarian may apply to become a Hungarian citizen, even if they do not live in Hungary. 

Dual citizenship is permitted under Hungarian law.

Citizenship by birth and adoption
A person acquires Hungarian citizenship at birth if at least one parent is a Hungarian citizen.   The place of birth is irrelevant.

Children born in Hungary to foreign parents do not acquire Hungarian citizenship at birth unless they would otherwise be stateless.

Minor children adopted by Hungarian citizens may apply and would normally be granted Hungarian citizenship.

Naturalization as a Hungarian citizen
Persons may apply to be naturalized as a Hungarian citizen after 8 years continuous residence in Hungary if they:

 have no criminal past at all,
 have a stable livelihood,
 are of good character, and
 pass a test in basic constitutional studies.

Persons may apply to be naturalized after 5 years residence in Hungary if they were:
 born in Hungary, or
 established residence in Hungary before age 18, or
 are stateless.

Persons may apply to be naturalized after 3 years residence in Hungary if they are:

 spouses of Hungarian citizens who have been married for three years (or who are widows or widowers),
 parents of Hungarian citizen minor children,
 persons adopted by Hungarian citizens, or
 recognised refugees.

Persons may apply to be naturalized if they are:
 spouses of Hungarian citizens who have been married for at least ten years, or
 spouses of Hungarian citizens who have been married for at least five years and they have a child together, and
 able to provide proof of proficiency in the Hungarian language.

Applicants aged 60 or over, those of diminished capacity, and persons holding a Hungarian language diploma (from a Hungarian institution) may be exempted the constitutional studies requirement.

Citizenship by ancestry
The Hungarian citizenship law of 2011 allows ethnic Hungarians to apply for simplified naturalisation if they can speak Hungarian and provide evidence of Hungarian ancestry. A person may apply for simplified naturalisation if the applicant is a descendant of a person who was a Hungarian citizen before 1920 (only the Kingdom of Hungary, part of the Austro-Hungarian Empire, is eligible) or between 1941 and 1945 and the applicant speaks Hungarian. They may become a Hungarian citizen even if they do not live in Hungary. 

The law has created controversy as some five million ethnic Hungarians living beyond Hungary's borders, mostly in Romania, Slovakia, Serbia and Ukraine, may claim Hungarian citizenship. There are Hungarians living in Slovakia, Serbia, Ukraine, Romania, and Austria whose ancestors lost Hungarian citizenship as a result of the peace treaty ending World War I.

By December 2019, more than 1,100,000 applications had been filed and over 950,000 people had been granted citizenship. The main sources of applicants were 650,000 from Transylvania (Romania), 150,000 from Vojvodina (Serbia) and 120,000 from Ukraine.

Hungarian citizenship by declaration
Declaration is a simplified form of naturalisation. The following people may be eligible to acquire Hungarian citizenship by declaration:

 persons who lost Hungarian citizenship through emigration between 15 September 1947 and 2 May 1990.
 Stateless persons aged less than 19, born in Hungary and residing in Hungary for the 5 years prior to the declaration.

Oath of allegiance
Persons becoming naturalised Hungarian citizens are expected to take an Oath of Allegiance as follows:

"I swear that I regard Hungary as my country. I will be a faithful citizen of the Republic of Hungary. I will respect and obey the Constitution and laws of this country. I defend my country to the utmost of my strength, I serve it to the best of my abilities. So help me God".

Those who prefer may take an equivalent solemn promise instead of an oath.

Loss of Hungarian citizenship
It is not possible for a person to lose Hungarian citizenship involuntarily. The exception concerns fraudulent applications for naturalisation (subject to a 20-year time bar after which action cannot be taken).

Hungarian citizens who hold another nationality and live outside Hungary may renounce their Hungarian citizenship.

Dual citizenship
Hungary allows its citizens to hold foreign citizenship in addition to their Hungarian citizenship. Some countries, however, do not permit multiple citizenship e.g. adults who acquired Hungarian and Japanese citizenship by birth must declare, to the latter's Ministry of Justice, before turning 22, which citizenship they want to keep.

Citizenship of the European Union
Because Hungary forms part of the European Union, Hungarian citizens are also citizens of the European Union under European Union law and thus enjoy rights of free movement and have the right to vote in elections for the European Parliament. When in a non-EU country where there is no Hungarian embassy, Hungarian citizens have the right to get consular protection from the embassy of any other EU country present in that country. Hungarian citizens can live and work in any country within the EU as a result of the right of free movement and residence granted in Article 21 of the EU Treaty.

Travel freedom of Hungarian citizens

Visa requirements for Hungarian citizens are administrative entry restrictions by the authorities of other states placed on citizens of Hungary. As of May 2018, Hungarian citizens had visa-free or visa on arrival access to 180 countries and territories, ranking the Hungarian passport 9th in terms of travel freedom according to the Henley Passport Index.

In 2017, the Hungarian nationality is ranked eighteenth in Nationality Index (QNI). This index differs from the Visa Restrictions Index, which focuses on external factors including travel freedom. The QNI considers, in addition, to travel freedom on internal factors such as peace & stability, economic strength, and human development as well.

See also
 Citizenship Act (Slovakia)

References

External links
 Office of Immigration and Nationality
 Act of Hungarian nationality, 1993

 
Hungary and the European Union